The Jungle Grows Back: America and Our Imperiled World is a 2018 book by American historian and foreign-policy commentator Robert Kagan, published by Alfred A. Knopf.  The book's argument is that the world order created by the United States in the wake of World War II is being overrun by jungle-like chaos.

References

Further reading 

 
 
 Book Review: The Jungle Grows Back by Francis P. Sempa
 Book Review: The Jungle Grows Back by Jim Miles
 US China power struggle: A new world order looms, but which stars will guide the way? by Dirk Kurbjuweit
Book Review: Robert Kagan’s “The Jungle Grows Back” by Mark Chapman
The US Foreign Policy Consensus in Crisis by  Richard W. Coughlin
 Robert Kagan’s Big Wrong Idea by Michael Lind

2018 non-fiction books
Political books
Alfred A. Knopf books